Cherry Red Records is a British independent record label founded in Malvern, Worcestershire by Iain McNay in 1978. The label has released recordings by Dead Kennedys, Everything But the Girl, The Monochrome Set, and Felt, among others, as well as the compilation album Pillows & Prayers. In addition to releasing new music, Cherry Red also acts as an umbrella for individual imprints and catalogue specialists.

Cherry Red was listed by Music Week as one of the UK's top ten record companies in Q1 2015 for sales of artist albums.

History
Cherry Red grew from the rock promotion company (similarly named after the song "Cherry Red" by The Groundhogs) founded in 1971 to promote rock concerts at the Malvern Winter Gardens. In the wake of the independent record boom that followed the advent of punk rock, founders Iain McNay (who remains company chairman) and Richard Jones released the label's first single, "Bad Hearts" by punk band The Tights in June 1978.

Cherry Red's early roster included releases by Morgan Fisher under various pseudonyms, using a small studio installed in his Notting Hill flat, as well as material licensed from The Hollywood Brats, Destroy All Monsters and The Runaways. The latter was the label's biggest seller until McNay invested $10,000 in the recording of the debut studio album by San Franciscan political punk band Dead Kennedys. Fresh Fruit for Rotting Vegetables (1979) and its attendant singles sold well worldwide. New A&R head Mike Alway had promoted the Snoopies venue in Richmond, London and been involved with the Scissor Fits, and signed groups including The Monochrome Set, Everything But The Girl, Eyeless in Gaza, Felt, and Five Or Six. McNay aspired for Cherry Red to be a label that offered a space for artists who would otherwise not fit the image of some of the more succinctly defined and stylised independents. "Cherry Red Records was always about musical individuality, diversity, character, commitment and passion," he stated in 2008. It also marketed other smaller independent record labels, like Bristol's Heartbeat Records, which recorded the Glaxo Babies.

Cherry Red's role as one of the keynote labels of the early 1980s independent scene was confirmed by the success of a budget compilation album compiled by Alway and released at Christmas 1982. Retailing for 99p, Pillows & Prayers topped the independent charts for several weeks. The label also released several albums from Adrian Sherwood and his ON-U Sound Label in the early 1980s.

Cherry Red continued to sign contemporary artists but increasingly moved into the reissue market from the late 1980s onwards. It has a number of subsidiary labels dealing in genre-specific releases, curating many "critically unloved" musical genres, in partial continuation of McNay's earlier advocacy of the unfashionable. The label began to acquire the rights to many independent labels from the 1970s and 1980s, including No Future, Flicknife, Rondelet, Midnight, Temple and In Tape - this spawned the "Collector" series of releases, which saw punk, psychobilly, goth and metal genres covered. Another "Collector" series that proved popular was the label's football releases, which released over 60 CDs of collections of club and country football songs.

The company has also signed agreements with a number of specialist reissue labels, which operate with a degree of autonomy using Cherry Red's logistical and financial support. Mark Stratford's RPM Records label focuses on pop music from the 1960s to the advent of punk. Esoteric Recordings, headed by Mark Powell, specialises in progressive rock and folk catalogue. Mark Brennan heads 7T's Records, which reissues albums by that decade's glam/glitter generation. (Brennan originally helped Cherry Red form one of its first subsidiary labels, Anagram, covering punk, Psychobilly and Goth, which remains active). él Records continues under the auspices of Mike Alway (but purely as a re-release label), alongside other labels including Poker, Giant Steps, Mortarhate, Now Sounds, and Ork. The Cherry Red label group continues to house reissues, but is also active in the release of new studio material by established artists such as Suzi Quatro, Marc Almond, Red Box, Van Der Graaf Generator, Jah Wobble & Keith Levene, Squackett (a collaboration between Steve Hackett and  Chris Squire), Hussey-Regan (a collaboration between Wayne Hussey and Julianne Regan), Hazel O'Connor,  The Christians and Ken Hensley.

Still headed by McNay, a fan of AFC Wimbledon, alongside managing director Adam Velasco, Cherry Red also has interests in football-related releases, with the most complete catalogue of soccer-related songs extant.

In 2007, the company launched a streaming television service, cherry red TV. It also publishes an in-house magazine and an 'in-house' publishing division, 'Cherry Red Songs'. Cherry Red's previous music publisher, Complete Music, was acquired by BMG Music Publishing in 2006.

In early 2015, Cherry Red Records and PWL reissued the first four Kylie Minogue albums, Kylie, Enjoy Yourself, Rhythm Of Love and Let's Get To It, as deluxe CD/DVD and LP boxsets.

Cherry Red also released a plethora of prestigious frontline albums by established artists that year, including Marc Almond's The Velvet Trail, The Zombies' Still Got That Hunger, Sarah Cracknell's Red Kite, Andy Bell of Erasure's Torsten The Bareback Saint, Jimmy Somerville's Homage, The Fall's Sub-Lingual Tablet and Wolfgang Flür's (ex-Kraftwerk) Eloquence to name a few.

In 2016 Cherry Red had its highest Top 40 chart position, with the new studio album from Hawkwind 'The Machine Stops' reaching No.29 in the Official UK Charts in April 2016.  It also announced the release the brand new studio album from Van Der Graaf Generator in September.

In 2017 Cherry Red confirmed it will be representing several label catalogues and artist discographies, including Procol Harum, The Residents, Arthur Brown, Captain Oi, Glenn Hughes and Tim Blake. It also acquired thirteen artist catalogues from Warner Music Group as part of the major's divestments to independent labels, including Howard Jones, Kim Wilde, Marc Almond, Third Ear Band, Dinosaur Jr., Mel & Kim, Fourplay (shared with Evolution Media Group), Renaissance (except their debut album, which remained with Elektra Records), Be-Bop Deluxe and Curved Air. These catalogues will be distributed worldwide through Absolute Label Services.

The 2017 BPI yearbook 'All About The Music' included Cherry Red in the 20 Market Share By Corporate Group at number 15, which explains the chart-eligible album sales of all record labels.

In 2018 Cherry Red acquired the extensive catalogue of Witchwood Media, home to the music of the Strawbs and a roster of other related artists.

In late 2019 and early 2020 Cherry Red acquired more label and album catalogue, including Safari Records (Toyah, Jayne County), Emerald Music, Genesis' debut album From Genesis To Revelation and Chapter One. Cherry Red have also acquired the catalogue from numerous independent labels including Inevitable Records (Dead Or Alive), Attrix Records (Peter & The Test Tube Babies) and Native Records (Screaming Trees). Artist catalogues acquired in 2020 include Glenn Hughes & Trapeze, rock band The Stairs & Edgar Jones, psychedelic rock band July, heavy metal band Sir Lord Baltimore, psychedelic rock band Outskirts Of Infinity, NWOBHM band Spider, guitarist Paul Brett, record producer and musician Tom Newman and Canadian pub rocker Philip Rambow. Also Warfare The song book of Filth (June 2021) featuring guests Pete Way, Fast Eddie Clarke Tom Angelripper among others.

2021 saw the label acquire the Dissonance Productions label and catalogue from Plastic Head Distribution. The extreme metal label has a catalogue of approximately 130 releases including At The Gates’ Gardens Of Grief, Holy Terror’s Terror & Submission, Nifelheim’s Servants Of Darkness and Ascension Of The Watchers’ Apocrypha. In 2021 and 2022 it released new albums by Agent Steel, Lawnmower Deth and Tokyo Blade. Notable catalogue acquisitions for the label in 2021 included deals for the catalogue of independent labels such as Golf, Abstract, Planet Dog and Peer Music. Artist catalogue the label now wholly or partially represent include Edward Ball (of The Times), Jah Wobble, Ron Geesin, Suzi Quatro, Miki Dallon and Dead Or Alive’s early recordings.

Notable awards and prizes
In June 2008 the Pillows & Prayers box set won the 'Best Catalogue Release category at that year's Mojo Honours.

At the 2013 Association of Independent Music Awards, Cherry Red won the Special Catalogue Release award for Scared To Get Happy - a box set that explored indie pop from 1980 to 1989.

In 2014, Cherry Red artist Dave Brock of Hawkwind won the Lifetime Achievement Award at the inaugural Prog (magazine) Progressive Music Awards 2014.  They also picked up nominations for Matt Stevens (Breakthrough Artist) and Panic Room (Best Anthem).

The 2015 Progressive Music Awards saw Genesis founder Tony Banks receive the Prog God award after his solo material catalogue reissue campaign with Cherry Red that year. The label also picked up nominations for John Lodge and Tin Spirits in the Best Anthem category, and Bill Nelson and Anthony Phillips in the Storm Thorgerson Grand Design Award category.

2016 has seen Cherry Red's biggest release of the first quarter of the year, the new studio album from Hawkwind 'The Machine Stops', receive a nomination for Album Of The Year in the Progressive Music Awards 2016, after it enjoyed Cherry Red's highest ever Top 40 chart position at No.29 in the Official UK Charts in April 2016.

Cherry Red have had two albums in the UK Album Charts Top 40 in 2017. Hawkwind's studio album Into The Woods charted at No. 34 in May  and The Fall's New Facts Emerge charted at No. 35 in July.

On 4 September 2018 at the AIM Independent Music Awards, Cherry Red Records Chairman Iain McNay won the Special Recognition Award for his service to independent music for over 40 years, as the label celebrated its 40th anniversary.

Hawkwind's studio album Road To Utopia charted at No 44 in the UK Albums Chart in September 2018.

Hawkwind's studio album 'All Aboard The Skylark' charted at No 34 in the UK Albums Chart in July 2019.

Jim Bob, former frontman of Carter The Unstoppable Sex Machine, charted at No 26 in the UK Albums Chart in August 2020 with his studio album 'Pop Up Jim Bob.'. His 2021 album 'Who Do We Hate Today' charted at No 34 on the UK Official Album Charts.

Other UK charting albums for the label in 2021 included Hawkwind's studio album 'Somnia' which entered at No 57, and Kim Wilde's Greatest Hits set 'Pop Don't Stop,' which charted at No 51.

Cherry Red artists

Original label artists

 Marc Almond
 Attila the Stockbroker
 Beau
 Blow Up
 Bodast
 The Charlottes
 Kevin Coyne
 Dead Kennedys
 Destroy All Monsters
 Everything but the Girl
 Eyeless in Gaza
 The Fall
 Felt
 Morgan Fisher
 Five or Six
 Grab Grab the Haddock
 The Hollywood Brats
 Kevin Hewick  
 In Embrace
 Inspiral Carpets
 Jane
 Jim Bob
 Thomas Leer
 The Long Ryders
 Marine Girls
 Medium Medium
 The Misunderstood
 Momus
 The Monochrome Set
 The Nightingales
 Nektar
 The Passage
 Pere Ubu
 Prolapse
 Suzi Quatro
 The Seers
 The Sting-rays
 Red Box
 The Runaways
 Tracey Thorn
 Warfare
 Zero Le Creche

Reissue label artists

 Marc Almond
 The Band of Holy Joy
 Be Bop Deluxe
 Beau
 Betty Boo
 Blue Orchids
 Marc Bolan
 Bow Wow Wow
 Breathe
 Bruce Foxton
 Brotherhood of Man
 Arthur Brown
 Chapterhouse
 Cranes
 Cud
 Curved Air
 The Dancing Did
 Divine
 Duffy Power
 Exposé
 Joe Meek
 Julia Fordham
 Frazier Chorus
 The Freshies
 Phillip Goodhand-Tait
 Paul Haig
 Hawkwind
 John Howard
 Into A Circle
 La Toya Jackson
 John's Children
 Howard Jones
 June Brides
 Katch 22
 Laibach
 Annabel Lamb
 The Long Ryders
 Donna Loren
 Marilyn
 Martha and the Muffins
 McCarthy
 Mel & Kim
 Kylie Minogue
 Mobiles
 Mood Six
 R. Stevie Moore
 Mozart Estate
 Martin Newell
 Bill Nelson
 Hazel O'Connor
 Paw
 Red Lorry Yellow Lorry
 Julian Jay Savarin (as Julian's Treatment)
 Screaming Trees
 The Servants
 Sex Gang Children
 Sheena Easton
 Spizzenergi
 Stavely Makepeace
 Sweet
 Suzi Quatro
 Tears for Fears
 Television Personalities
 Toyah
 Lon & Derrek Van Eaton
 Weekend
 Wigwam
 Kim Wilde
 Pete Wingfield
 The Woodentops
 Yeah Yeah Noh

Cherry Red associated imprint labels 
The full repertoire of  Cherry Red associated imprint labels as of 2016:

 30 Hertz
 359 Music
 3Loop Music
 7Ts
 Anagram Records
 Analog Baroque (Momus)
 Artpop
 Atomhenge
 Badfish
 Bella Casa
 Big Break Records
 Cherry Pop
 Cherry Red Football
 Cherry Red Records
 Cherry Tree
 Cocteau Discs
 Croydon Municipal
 el
 Esoteric Antenna
 Esoteric Recordings
 FiveFour
 Giant Steps
 Grapefruit
 HNE Recordings
 Hot Milk
 Hot Shot
 IronBird
 Lemon
 Manticore
 Morello
 Mortarhate
 Now Sounds
 Original Dope
 Phoenix City
 Poker
 Pressure Drop
 Purple Records
 Reactive
 Redline
 Rev-Ola
 Righteous
 Robinsongs
 RPM
 SFE
 Sidewinder Sounds
 SoulMusic Records
 SuperBird
 T-Bird Americana
 The Right Honourable Recording Company Ltd
 Tune In
 Visionary
 West Midlands
 WiseCrack Records

Compilations 
Notable compilations released by Cherry Red Records include:
 Avon Calling: tracks featuring bands from Bristol
 Close to the Noise Floor: Formative UK Electronica 1975-1984
 Flaming Schoolgirls: previously unreleased tracks by The Runaways
 The Genesis of Slade: tracks by the members of Slade from before the band's formation
 Leapers and Sleepers: Duffy Power
 Milking the Sacred Cow: selection of Dead Kennedys tracks
 Pillows & Prayers: tracks from Cherry Red artists
 Scared to Get Happy: A Story of Indie-Pop 1980–1989
 Silhouettes and Statues: A Gothic Revolution 1978-1986
 Songs in the Key of Z: outsider music tracks selected by Irwin Chusid
 That's All Very Well But...: singles and rarities by the band McCarthy
 Volume, Contrast, Brilliance...: unreleased tracks and early sessions by The Monochrome Set
 Your Box Set Pet (The Complete Recordings 1980–1984): three-volume compilation of Bow Wow Wow tracks

Marketing
From July 2018 to August 2020, Cherry Red were the main shirt sponsor for English football league club Wycombe Wanderers.  They are also the longstanding stadium sponsor for League Two club AFC Wimbledon, both at their original Kingsmeadow ground from 2003 and at the new Plough Lane since 2021.

See also
 List of independent UK record labels

References

External links
 Official site
 Matt Bristow interviews Cherry Red Records Chairman Iain McNay about his successful independent label

 
British independent record labels
Record labels established in 1978
Alternative rock record labels
Reissue record labels
IFPI members